Koshur Akhbar is an online newspaper from the Indian state of Jammu and Kashmir that carries news and literary pieces in the Kashmiri language. It is the first online newspaper in Kashmiri. There is no daily newspaper published in print media in this language, however there are weeklies currently getting published in print media. 

Koshur Akhbar provides an opportunity to Kashmiris all over the world to be informed of events of Jammu & Kashmir in their own language. It helps in developing literacy of Kashmiri among its visitors.

References

External links
Koshur Akhbar

Newspapers published in India
Mass media in Jammu and Kashmir
2005 establishments in Jammu and Kashmir
Newspapers established in 2005
Kashmiri-language websites